Edward John Lightfoot (13 November 1889 – 20 July 1918) was an English footballer who played for Harrowby, Southport Central and Tottenham Hotspur.

Football career 
Lightfoot signed for Tottenham Hotspur after spells with Harrowby and Southport. The left half featured in 66 matches and scored twice in all competitions between 1911 and 1915.

First World War 
Lightfoot was one of several former and current (at that time) Spurs players who died in action in World War I. In early 1916, Lightfoot joined the Royal Garrison Artillery, reaching the rank of sergeant. He died at 1st Australian Casualty Clearing Station in Esquelbecq on 20 July 1918; the cause of his death is unknown. Lightfoot is buried at the Esquelbecq Military Cemetery.

Perseus writing in the Lancashire Daily Post paid the following tribute "Edward Lightfoot was a splendid footballer but, more than that, he was a good sportsman and a player that respected both himself and his opponents. He has joined a noble company who will leave a big void in football".

References 

1889 births
1918 deaths
Military personnel from Lancashire
Burials in France
People from Litherland
Footballers from Liverpool
English footballers
Association football wing halves
Harrowby F.C. players
Southport F.C. players
Tottenham Hotspur F.C. players
English Football League players
British military personnel killed in World War I
Southport F.C. wartime guest players
Royal Garrison Artillery soldiers
British Army personnel of World War I